Epic Conditions is a non-fiction television series shown on The Weather Channel that premiered on Sunday, March 4, 2007. The show's main emphasis to show viewers about how weather can affect athletic and sports events. Epic Conditions and WeatherVentures launched as The Weather Channel's first HD programs on Monday, October 1, 2007 - HD studio shows would not start until eight months later.

References

External links
Official show web site

The Weather Channel original programming
2007 American television series debuts
2000s American documentary television series
Year of television series ending missing